B type or Type B may refer to:

Astronomy
 B-type asteroid, a type of relatively uncommon type of carbonaceous asteroid
 B-type giant, a type of blue giant star
 B-type star, a type of star

Biology
 B type blood, a type in the ABO blood group system
 B type inclusion, a type of inclusions in cells infected with poxvirus
 B-type natriuretic peptide, a type of brain natriuretic peptides
 B type proanthocyanidin, a specific type of flavanoids
 Type B evaluation of uncertainty, an uncertainty in measurement inferred from scientific judgement or other information concerning the possible values of the quantity
 Type B personality, a type in the Type A and Type B personality theory

Others
 B-type warbird, a type of Romulan starship
 Type B videotape, an open-reel videotape format
 Curtiss-built B-type, a type of B class blimp
 LGOC B-type, a model of double-decker bus that was introduced in London on 1910
 Mann Egerton Type B, a 1910s British maritime patrol aircraft
 Toyota Type B engine, an internal combustion engine
 Vauxhall B-Type, a large car from 1911 to 1914
 Type B ship, a U.S. designation for World War II barges

See also
 B class (disambiguation)
 Class B (disambiguation)